Minister without portfolio or Honorary Minister was the title given to a member of the Cabinet who did not have responsibility for a department or portfolio. They were not paid in addition to their allowance as a member of parliament. The title was first used in the Lyne ministry in 1901 when Paddy Crick ceased to be Postmaster-General as a result of the Federation of Australia and remained in the Cabinet until he was appointed Secretary for Lands in the See ministry. The first people appointed without a portfolio were James Hayes, and Walter Bennett in the See ministry. The ministers without a portfolio were often given specific responsibilities using section 36 of the Constitution of New South Wales under which the Governor could authorise any member of the cabinet to perform the duties of another minister, except for the Attorney General. The title was last used in the third Cahill ministry. From 1959 the title "minister assisting ..." or "assistant minister ..." has been used.

List of ministers

References 

Railways